The ArtsPeak Arts Festival is held in Canmore, Alberta, Canada every June and celebrates Canmore's artistic spirit by featuring performing artists, artists and artisans, an art walk, a literary festival, film screenings, and street performers.

External links
Canmore artsPeak Arts Festival
Arts festivals in Alberta
Literary festivals in Alberta
Art festivals in Canada
Canmore, Alberta
June events